Aaron Collins may refer to:

Aaron Collins (footballer) (born 1997), Welsh footballer
Aaron Collins (rugby union) (born 1971), New Zealand rugby union player
Aaron Collins (singer) (1930–1997), American singer